is a Japanese actor and tarento.

Filmography

TV dramas

Films

Stage

Anime television

Variety

References

External links
 
 – Ameba Blog (8 September 2014 –) 
 – Ameba Blog (12 December 2008 – 8 September 2014) 

Japanese male stage actors
Japanese television personalities
Actors from Saitama Prefecture
People from Ageo, Saitama
1969 births
Living people